Kresge may refer to:

People 
 Kresge (surname)

Companies and organizations 
 The Kresge Foundation, a philanthropic organization established by Sebastian S. Kresge in 1924
 Kresge Hearing Research Institute, research institute of Department of Otolaryngology in Ann Arbor, Michigan
 Kresge Auditorium, a main performance space for the Massachusetts Institute of Technology
 Kresge Art Museum, an art museum in East Lansing, Michigan that houses Michigan State University's art collection
 S. S. Kresge Corporation, predecessor of  Kmart retail stores
 Kresge College, one of the residential colleges that make up the University of California, Santa Cruz
 Kresge-Newark, a department store based in Newark, New Jersey, operated by Sebastian S. Kresge
 Kresge Chapel
 S. S. Kresge World Headquarters

See also 
 Kresge Building (disambiguation)